Markus "Mako" Heikkinen (born 13 October 1978) is a Finnish former professional footballer who played as a centre back or defensive midfielder.

Club career
An integral part of the Luton side that finished 10th in The Championship in the 2005–2006 season, Heikkinen collected four awards – the Player of the Year trophy, Players' Player of the Season, Internet Player of the Season and the Luton News Player of the Season.

His previous clubs include OPS, TPS Turku, MyPa, HJK, Portsmouth, Aberdeen and Luton Town. Whilst at Portsmouth he contributed two appearances as they won the First Division Championship and promotion to the Premier League.

During his two years with Aberdeen, Heikkinen was popular and important player, who usually featured in central midfield, where he had a reputation as a tough tackling and dependable player. Despite repeated attempts by Aberdeen manager Jimmy Calderwood to get the player to sign a new deal, he indicated that he was unsettled at Aberdeen and wanted to move on.

On 29 December 2006, in a game for Luton against Birmingham City he was feared to have a compound fracture of the fibula, however it was in fact a nasty gash down his leg, after a late challenge by midfielder Fabrice Muamba. He returned to action against Stoke City on 17 February 2007.

After his years in England Heikkinen played six seasons for Rapid Wien. He was a key player of the team, making over 170 appearances for the Austrian Bundesliga side.

On 10 August 2013, he signed for Norwegian Tippeliga club Start. Heikkinen helped Start avoid relegation with solid performances.

After years abroad, "Mako" returned to Finland and HJK in December 2013. After two seasons with the Helsinki-based side, on 2 September 2015 it was reported that the 36-year-old Heikkinen had signed a three-year player-coach contract with his hometown team AC Oulu.

International career

Heikkinen made his national team debut on 4 January 2002 against Bahrain. He immediately became an important defensive player to his native team. He often played as defensive midfielder. However, he returned to his old position as centre back in 2010, after Hannu Tihinen retired in professional football. He announced his retirement from international football on 26 September 2011.

Career statistics

References

External links
 
 
  
 

1978 births
Living people
People from Katrineholm Municipality
Finnish footballers
Association football central defenders
Association football midfielders
Finland international footballers
Turun Palloseura footballers
Myllykosken Pallo −47 players
Helsingin Jalkapalloklubi players
Portsmouth F.C. players
Aberdeen F.C. players
Luton Town F.C. players
SK Rapid Wien players
IK Start players
Veikkausliiga players
English Football League players
Scottish Premier League players
Austrian Football Bundesliga players
Eliteserien players
Finnish expatriate footballers
Finnish expatriate sportspeople in England
Expatriate footballers in England
Finnish expatriate sportspeople in Scotland
Expatriate footballers in Scotland
Finnish expatriate sportspeople in Austria
Expatriate footballers in Austria
Finnish expatriate sportspeople in Norway
Expatriate footballers in Norway